The Agha Zia ol Din Mosque dates from the Qajar dynasty and is located in Arak.

See also
 Islam in Iran

References

Mosques in Iran
Mosque buildings with domes
National works of Iran